Sainte-Anne-des-Monts Aerodrome  is located  west of Sainte-Anne-des-Monts, Quebec, Canada.

References

Registered aerodromes in Gaspésie–Îles-de-la-Madeleine